Broadgate is an area in the northeast of the City of London:

Broadgate may also refer to:
Broadgate, East Riding of Yorkshire, England
Broadgate, Hampshire, England
Broadgate, the area in the centre of Coventry (England)
Broadgate, a street in the centre of Lincoln, Lincolnshire, England (part of the A15)
Broadgate, Lancashire, an area of Preston, Lancashire, England
Broadgate, a road in Beeston, Nottinghamshire
Broadgate Park, on the Beeston/Nottingham border

See also
 Bradgate (disambiguation)